State Highway 28 (SH-28) is a  state highway in Idaho which runs from Idaho State Highway 33 (SH-33) near Mud Lake to U.S. Route 93 in Salmon. The entire length of the route is designated as the Sacajawea Historic Byway by the state of Idaho.

Route description

Idaho State Highway 28 begins at an intersection with ID 33. The route heads northwest before passing the Mud Lake Airport, proceeding to an intersection with State Highway 22.  After a long distance, it proceeds through the Lemhi Valley, bending north before curving northwest again for a short distance. The roadway passes the Leadore Airport on its way into Leadore, meeting Idaho State Highway 29 while in the community. Just after exiting the town, the road travels parallel to the Lemhi River for several miles before ending at U.S. Route 93 in the community of Salmon.

Major junctions

See also

 List of state highways in Idaho
 List of highways numbered 28

References

External links

028
Transportation in Jefferson County, Idaho
Transportation in Butte County, Idaho
Transportation in Clark County, Idaho
Transportation in Lemhi County, Idaho